The Asanbosam, or more commonly Sasabonsam, is a vampire-like folkloric being from the Akan people. It belongs to the folklore of the Akan of southern Ghana, as well as Côte d'Ivoire, Togo and 18th century Jamaica from enslaved Akan. It is said to have iron teeth, pink skin, long red hair and iron hooks for feet and lives in trees, attacking from above. In the forests of West Africa, there were rules of renewal, and the Sasabonsam would enforce these rules. They take up territory in the trees in the forests, where they live and  feed on people that wander into their home. It becomes a territorial aspect for them. While being  humanoid, these creatures have bat-like features. Sasabonsam resemble bats well, such a  feature would be their wings, which are near 20 feet long. A good representation can be seen from The British Museum with the Sasabonsam figure they have in their collection. It is carved out of wood and estimated to have been made in 1935.

In mythology, it is usually portrayed as an archetypical ogre; according to A Dictionary of World Mythology:

...the hairy Sasabonsam has large blood-shot eyes, long legs, and feet pointing both ways. Its favourite trick is to sit on the high branches of a tree and dangle its legs so as to entangle the unwary hunter.

Both the ogre and vampire versions have iron teeth.

Popular culture 
Sasabonsam are featured in the 2021 fantasy novel Skin of the Sea by Natasha Bowen.

Two characters, Asanbosam and Sasabonsam, brothers, appear in Marlon James's 2019 novel Black Leopard Red Wolf. They are "monstrous eaters of human flesh." One of the brothers, Sasabonsam, has wings.

References

West African legendary creatures
Ghanaian culture
Ivorian culture
Togolese culture
Vampires
Akan culture